Rosti is a surname. Notable people with the surname include:

 Antonio Rosti (born 1993), Italian footballer
 Stephan Rosti (1891–1964), Egyptian actor and film director 
 Vicky Rosti (born 1958), Finnish singer of popular music

See also
 Rösti (disambiguation)
Roti